The FC Basel 1895–96 season was their third season since the club's foundation on 15 November 1893. Emanuel Schiess was elected as second chairman in the club's history at the club's AGM. FC Basel's home ground was the Landhof, in the Wettstein neighborhood of Kleinbasel (lesser Basel), but they also played home games at the Stadion Schützenmatte in the Bachletten quartier in Grossbasel (greater Basel). The Swiss national championships had not yet been called to into life.

Overview 
Roland Geldner had been the club's chairman, but he stood down at the club's AGM held on 1 September 1895 and Emanuel Schiess was elected as new chairman. At this AGM on it was announced that 31 footballers had joined the club since the first day, 14 members had since left and so they had 17 active footballers.

The Swiss Football Association (ASF-SFV) was founded on 7 April 1895. FC Basel were founder members, although they were not present at the founder meeting. Basel goalkeeper and local businessman John Tollmann joined the ASF-SFV board of directors and was the first secretary-treasurer. Local rivals Old Boys were soon to become ASF-SFV members. The idea of a Swiss national championship following the form of the English championship was discussed as priority.

Ferdinand Isler was selected as team captain, he was responsible for leading the team trainings and choosing the player line-ups. For this season club organised ten friendly matches for their first team. Six of these matches were held in Basel, two in the Landhof, two on the Schützenmatte and from the other two games the playing fields are uncertain. In the autumn season Basel played twice against FC Excelsior Zürich, were defeated away and drew at home and in the spring they played them again twice and managed two victories. Basel played twice against French team FC Mulhouse, drawing away and winning at home. They also played twice against Grasshopper Club and won both games. Last season the team had lost the game against Buckjumpers Club Basel, this season they won the revenge. But the Buckjumpers were to dissolve their club at the end of the season, due to lack of members and therefore a number of their remaining members joined Basel before the beginning of the following season.

At the end of November 1895 Basel also played their very first game against Anglo-American Club Zürich, the game ended with a defeat. The ten games ended with six victories, two draws and two defeats. The team scored 18 scored goals and 15 conceded.

Players

Results 

Legend

Friendly matches

Autumn season

Spring season

See also 
 History of FC Basel
 List of FC Basel players
 List of FC Basel seasons

Notes

Footnotes

References

Sources 
 Rotblau: Jahrbuch Saison 2014/2015. Publisher: FC Basel Marketing AG. 
 Die ersten 125 Jahre. Publisher: Josef Zindel im Friedrich Reinhardt Verlag, Basel. 
 FCB squad 1895–1896 at fcb-archiv.ch
''(NB: Despite all efforts, the editors of these books and the authors in "Basler Fussballarchiv" have failed to be able to identify all the players, their date and place of birth or date and place of death, who played in the games during the early years of FC Basel. Much match documentation for this season is missing.)

External links 
 FC Basel official site

FC Basel seasons
Basel